Masate (local ) is a comune (municipality) in the Province of Milan in the Italian region Lombardy, located about  northeast of Milan.

Masate borders the following municipalities: Basiano, Pozzo d'Adda, Cambiago, Gessate, Inzago.

Demographic evolution

References

External links
 www.unione.basianomasate.mi.it/Index.asp

Cities and towns in Lombardy